David Petersen (born Lübeck ca. 1650 or 1651 – died Amsterdam, before 5 May 1737) was a violinist and composer of north German origin active in the Netherlands (United Provences). His last name is also spelled Pietersen.

In the 1670s he travelled to Lund, Sweden where he was an employee of the newly founded University. By 1680, however, he had moved to Amsterdam where he remained for the rest of his career.

He is notable for a collection of twelve sonatas for violin and basso continuo published in 1683 entitled Speelstukken. It is the only Dutch publication of its type in this period. There are similar collections of pieces for violin and bass by German composers such as Westhoff and Biber; however the sonatas are closest in style to Johann Jakob Walther's Scherzi da Violino solo con il basso continuo published in 1676. It is possible that Walther had connections to Amsterdam and may have taught Petersen.

Petersen's other compositions include a large number of song settings with continuo in Dutch. They were published in Amsterdam in collaboration with the Dutch poets Abraham Alewijn and Cornelis Sweerts. Petersen is also closely associated with a number of composers such as Servaes de Koninck and Hendrik Anders. Along with Johannes Schenck, Carolus Hacquart and Carl Rosier they contributed to a revival of Dutch music and arts in the period before 1710.

Published works
Speelstukken, Amsterdam, 1683
Zede- en Harpgezangen met Zangkunst verrykt door David Petersen (24 songs to words by Abraham Alewijn), Amsterdam, 1694
Vermeerderde Zede- en Harpgezangen (words by Alewijn), Amsterdam, 1711
Zede- en Harpgezangen (words by Alewijn), Amsterdam, 1713
Zede- en Harpgezangen (words by Alewijn), Amsterdam, 1715
Boertige en Ernstige Minnezangen (music by Petersen and Hendrik Anders; words by Cornelis Sweerts), Amsterdam, 1705
Boertige en Ernstige Minnezangen (music by Petersen and De Koninck, words by Alewijn), Amsterdam, 1705
Boertige en Ernstige Minnezangen (music by Petersen and De Koninck, words by Alewijn), Amsterdam, 1709
Incidental music for the play Andromeda, Amsterdam, 1730

Notes

References
Manfredo Kraemer, CD booklet notes from David Petersen: Speelstukken, Rare Fruits Council, directed by Manfredo Kraemer, Auvidis Astrée E8615, 1998
Rudolf A Rasch, "Petersen [Pietersen], David", New Grove Dictionary of Music and Musicians

1650s births
1737 deaths
German Baroque composers
Dutch male classical composers
Dutch classical composers
German classical composers
German male classical composers
German classical violinists
Male classical violinists
German violinists
German male violinists
Musicians from Lübeck
18th-century classical composers
18th-century German composers
18th-century German male musicians